Libor Zábranský Jr. (born 26 May 2000) is a Czech ice hockey defenceman currently playing for the Kamloops Blazers of the Western Hockey League (WHL). He is the son of the Czech former professional ice hockey defenceman Libor Zábranský Sr.

Playing career
In August 2017, he was the captain of men's national under-18 team in the Ivan Hlinka Memorial Tournament. The national team got into the finals where they lost to Canada 4–1. Zábranský himself, however, could not play the final match due to injury.

In April 2018, he was the captain of the same team in the World U18 Championships. In the preliminary round, the team defeated only France finishing in 4th place. However, in the quarterfinals, the team created major upset defeating Canada 2–1.

He was also appointed captain of the men's national under-20 team for the 2020 World Junior Championships.

In the CSB ranking for the 2018 NHL Entry Draft, he ranked on 115th place in North American Skaters category.

Career statistics

Regular season and playoffs

International

References

External links
 
 Statistics for Czech hockey leagues and representation matches from hokej.cz

2000 births
Czech ice hockey defencemen
Fargo Force players
HC Kometa Brno players
Kelowna Rockets players
Living people
Moose Jaw Warriors players
Ice hockey people from Brno
Saskatoon Blades players
Czech expatriate ice hockey players in Finland
Czech expatriate ice hockey players in Canada
Czech expatriate ice hockey players in the United States